Robert Hughes may refer to:

Entertainment
Robert Hughes (actor) (born 1948), Australian former actor 
Robert Hughes (composer) (1912–2007), Scots-Australian composer
Robert Hughes (critic) (1938–2012), Australian art critic, writer and broadcaster
Robert Hughes (poet) (1744–1785), Welsh poet
Robert Alwyn Hughes (1935–2020), Welsh artist
Robert Ball Hughes (1804–1868), British-American sculptor
Robert Don Hughes (born 1949), American writer
Robert Earl Hughes (1926–1958), American one-time "World's Heaviest Human" according to the Guinness Book of Records
Robert F. Hughes, American television director
Robert Vincent Hughes, also known as Vincent (music producer)

Politics
Robert Hughes, Baron Hughes of Woodside (1932–2022), British Labour politician, MP for Aberdeen North
Robert Hughes (Conservative politician) (born 1951), British Conservative politician, MP for Harrow West
Robert H. Hughes (1925–2017), American politician in the Texas House of Representatives

Sports
Robert Hughes (American football) (born 1989), American football running back
Judge Hughes (Robert E. Hughes, 1944–2013), American football player and college coach
Robert Hughes (basketball) (born 1928), all-time winningest high school basketball coach
Robert Hughes (cricketer) (born 1973), former English cricketer
Robert Hughes (darts player) (born 1966), Welsh darts player
Robert Hughes (footballer) (born 1986), of St Neots Town
Robert Hughes (swimmer) (1930–2012), American Olympic water polo player and swimmer
Bob Hughes (athlete) (born 1947), British Olympic athlete

Other
Robert Arthur Hughes (1910–1996), British medical missionary
Robert M. Hughes (1855–1940), American lawyer
Robert Roland Hughes (1911–1991), British neurologist
Robert S. Hughes (died 1900), American, president of Rogers Locomotive and Machine Works
Robert William Hughes (1821–1901), American newspaperman, lawyer, and Virginia judge
Robert Hughes (conservationist) (1847–1935), New Zealand lawyer and conservationist
Robert Patterson Hughes (1839–1909), American military commander

See also
Bob Hughes, American fictional soap opera character from As the World Turns
 Bob Hughes (Neighbours), Australian fictional soap opera character from Neighbours
 Hughes (surname)